Minuscule 37 (in the Gregory-Aland numbering), A154 (Von Soden), is a Greek minuscule manuscript of the New Testament, written on vellum. Palaeographically it has been assigned to the 11th century.

Description 

The codex contains the complete text of the four Gospels on 357 parchment leaves.

There is also a division according to the Ammonian Sections (in Mark 233, 16:8), with references to the Eusebian Canons.

The pericope John 7:53-8:11 is placed at the end; in John 8:6 it used textual variant μη προσποιουμενος.

Text 

The Greek text of the codex is a representative of the Byzantine text-type. Aland placed it in Category V. It was not examined by the Claremont Profile Method.

In Luke 16:19 the manuscript has scholion on a margin of uncertain date ευρον δε τινες και του πλουσιου εν τισιν αντιγραφοις τουνομα Νινευης λεγομενον. The same scholion has manuscript 36. Currently we have only one Greek manuscript with textual variant ονοματι Ν[ιν]ευης (with the name N[in]eue) in Luke 16:19 - Papyrus 75. This reading has also Sahidic version.

History 

The manuscript was dated to the 11th or to the 12th century. Currently it has been assigned by the INTF to the 11th century.

The manuscript was examined and described by Montfaucon, Wettstein, Scholz, and Paulin Martin.

It was added to the list of the New Testament manuscripts by Wettstein. C. R. Gregory saw the manuscript in 1885.

It is currently housed at the Bibliothèque nationale de France (Coislin Gr. 21) at Paris.

See also 

 List of New Testament minuscules
 Biblical manuscript
 Textual criticism

References

Further reading 
 Herman C. Hoskier, Concerning the Text of the Apocalypse 1 (London, 1929), pp. 32–33.

Greek New Testament minuscules
11th-century biblical manuscripts
Fonds Coislin